Children of the Ghetto or Child of the Ghetto may refer to:

Literature
 Children of the Ghetto (novel) (Children of the Ghetto: A Study of a Peculiar People), an 1892 novel by Israel Zangwill, and its 1899 dramatisation
 Children of the Ghetto: My Name Is Adam, a 2016 novel by Elias Khoury

Film
 Children of the Ghetto (film), a 1915 American film

Music
 Children of the Ghetto, a 2006 album by Winston Jarrett
 "Children of the Ghetto", a song by Crystal Waters on the 2014 Hip Hop Caucus compilation album Home
 "Children of the Ghetto", a 1986 song by Courtney Pine featuring Susaye Greene
 "Children of the Ghetto", a song by Dave Liebman from the 1976 album Light'n Up, Please!
 "Children of the Ghetto", a 1998 song by Klaus Waldeck
 "Children of the Ghetto", a song by Philip Bailey from the 1984 album Chinese Wall
 "Children of the Ghetto", a song by South Park Mexican from the 1995 album Hillwood
 "Children of the Ghetto", a song by The Real Thing on the 1979 single "Can You Feel the Force?"
"Children of the Ghetto", a version by Mary J. Blige on her 2002 No More Drama Tour

See also
Chilldrin of da Ghetto, 1999 self-titled album by Chilldrin of da Ghetto
A Child of the Ghetto, a 1910 silent film
 Child of the Ghetto, a 2001 album by G. Dep